Letters in Mathematical Physics is a peer-reviewed scientific journal in mathematical physics published by Springer Science+Business Media. It publishes letters and longer research articles, occasionally also articles containing topical reviews. It is essentially a platform for the rapid dissemination of short contributions in the field of mathematical physics. In addition, the journal publishes contributions to modern mathematics in fields which have a potential physical application, and developments in theoretical physics which have potential mathematical impact. The editors are Volker Bach, Edward Frenkel, Maxim Kontsevich, Dirk Kreimer, Nikita Nekrasov, Massimo Porrati, and Daniel Sternheimer.

Abstracting and indexing 
The following services abstract or index Letters in Mathematical Physics: Academic OneFile, Academic Search, Astrophysics Data System, Chemical Abstracts Service, Current Contents/Physical, Chemical and Earth Sciences, Current Index to Statistics, EBSCO, EI-Compendex, INIS Atomindex, Inspec, Mathematical Reviews, ProQuest, Science Citation Index, Scopus, Summon by Serial Solutions, and Zentralblatt MATH. According to the Journal Citation Reports, its 2021 impact factor is 1.520.

External links 
 

Physics journals
Mathematics journals
Springer Science+Business Media academic journals
Monthly journals
Publications established in 1975
English-language journals